Alfred Maurer may refer to:
 Alfred Henry Maurer (1868–1932), American modernist painter
 Alfred Werner Maurer (born 1945), German architect, urban planner and art historian
 Alfred Maurer (politician) (1888–1954), Estonian politician